Adelaida (pronounced as, and in the 19th century commonly spelled as Adelaide) is an unincorporated community in San Luis Obispo County, California, United States. The community had a post office from 1877 to 1936.

History
In the 1880s, the population of Adelaida was approximately 500, supported by the prospering Klau and Buena Vista mercury mines.  The town boasted a community center, saloon, dance hall, general store, and four schools.  The population increased further in 1898 with an influx of Mennonite settlers.  The Adelaida School, located near the entrance to the Osgood Ranch on Chimney Rock Road, was built in 1917.  It is being restored by the Adelaida Historical Foundation.  This school and the Klau Mine Road cemetery are all that is left of old Adelaida.  Although the quicksilver mines were in operation into the 1970s, most of the local businesses had long since relocated to Paso Robles.

See also
Adelaida Cellars

References

External links
A day trip to the town of Adelaida, SLO Tribune, January 10, 2011 
Adelaida one room schoolhouse closes, 1964, SLO Tribune, reprint of June 14, 1964, edition of the Telegram-Tribune
Adelaida (SLO County) profile

Unincorporated communities in San Luis Obispo County, California
Unincorporated communities in California
Santa Lucia Range